The 1911 San Diego mayoral election was held on April 4, 1911 to elect the mayor for San Diego. Incumbent Mayor Grant Conard and James E. Wadham received the most votes in the primary election and advanced to the runoff. Wadham was then elected mayor with a majority of the votes.

Candidates
James E. Wadham, attorney and 1903 mayoral candidate
Grant Conard, Mayor of San Diego
G.W. Miner

Campaign
Incumbent Mayor Grant Conard, a Republican, stood for reelection on a non-partisan ticket. Conard's reelection was challenged by James E. Wadham, a Democrat. Also contesting the race was G.W. Miner, a Socialist.

On March 21, 1911, Conard and Wadham received the two highest vote totals in the primary and advanced to the general election. Wadham was then elected mayor on April 4, 1911 with a majority of the votes in the runoff.

Primary Election results

General Election results

References

1911
1911 California elections
1911
1911 United States mayoral elections
April 1911 events